Vincenzo Sgambato (born 27 January 1988) is an Italian footballer.

Biography
Born in Avellino, Campania, Sgambato started his career at Campanian side Napoli. After the Naples club went bankrupt, he joined Internazionale. In the first season he was the right-back of Allievi Nazionali under-17 team. In the next season he was promoted to Berretti under-18 team (B team of under-20 age group) His only appearances with the first team was a friendly during international fixture. Roberto Mancini fielded players without international duty against Swiss side Lugano.

He was transferred to Lecce in August 2006. He played a season in Primavera under-20 team before returned to Campania for Benevento. However he only played once in 2007–08 Serie C2 and played for Benevento's Berretti team as overage player in 2008–09 season. In January 2009 he was loaned to Vibonese and on 10 July loaned to Foggia as part of Ivan Pedrelli's deal.

In mid-2010 he was signed by Seconda Divisione newcomer Gavorrano and made his official debut on 18 August 2010, the first round of 2010–11 Coppa Italia Lega Pro. He also started for Gavorrano in the second cup match and the first round of the league. However he was rested in the third and fourth cup game, the mid-week fixture. That season he made a career high of 28 official appearances. He was suspended twice: 2 matches for being sent off in round 4 and one match for the fourth caution of the season in round 26. He was rested in the last round (the thirty).

On 1 February 2013 he was signed by Melfi; He did not play any game in the first half of 2012–13 season for Gavorrano.

International career
Sgambato received a few cap from Italy U-16 and U-17 team in friendlies to prepare for 2005 UEFA European Under-17 Football Championship, which only born in 1988 or after would eligible. Italy qualified as host. He was not selected to the final tournament, but selected to 2005 European Youth Olympic Festival from FIGC for born 1988/1989 mixed team. He played all three matches, finished as the runner-up.

Honours
 Serie C2: 2008 (Benevento)

References

External links
 Football.it Profile 
 FIGC 
 Gavorrano Profile 

Italian footballers
S.S.C. Napoli players
Inter Milan players
U.S. Lecce players
Benevento Calcio players
U.S. Vibonese Calcio players
Calcio Foggia 1920 players
U.S. Gavorrano players
A.S. Melfi players
Serie C players
Italy youth international footballers
Association football fullbacks
People from Avellino
1988 births
Living people
Footballers from Campania
Sportspeople from the Province of Avellino